Esterdy (also spelled Esterday) is an unincorporated community in Byron Township, Cass County, Minnesota, United States, near Motley and Staples. It is along 90th Street SW near 85th Avenue SW.

References

Unincorporated communities in Cass County, Minnesota
Unincorporated communities in Minnesota